Lupi, officially the Municipality of Lupi, is a 3rd class municipality in the province of Camarines Sur, Philippines. According to the 2020 census, it has a population of 33,897 people.

History
Lupi, in the first district of the province, was branded as a "travelling poblacion" as it had been transferred several times when it was a small settlement during Spanish rule.  On 17 October 1726, however, the Spanish government under the administration of Governor General Marquéz de Torrecampo who was also the titular head of the Diocese of Caceres, issued a decree making Lupi a separate town.

Geography

Barangays
Lupi is politically subdivided into 38 barangays.

Climate

Demographics

Economy

Transportation
The municipality is connected with Manila by the Andaya Highway and daily rail services to and from Naga & Legazpi are provided by the Philippine National Railways.

In order to spur development in the municipality, The Toll Regulatory Board declared Toll Road 5 the extension of South Luzon Expressway. A 420-kilometer, four lane expressway starting from the terminal point of the now under construction SLEX Toll Road 4 at Barangay Mayao, Lucena City in Quezon to Matnog, Sorsogon, near the Matnog Ferry Terminal. On August 25, 2020, San Miguel Corporation announced that they will invest the project which will reduce travel time from Lucena to Matnog from 9 hours to 5.5 hours.

Another expressway that will serve Lupi is the Quezon-Bicol Expressway (QuBEx), which will link between Lucena and San Fernando, Camarines Sur.

References

External links 
 [ Philippine Standard Geographic Code]
Official Site of the Province of Camarines Sur
Philippine Census Information

Municipalities of Camarines Sur